Ginger Orsi (born May 13, 1984 in California) is an American singer and former actress.

She is best known for her role as Amanda Phillips on the 1980s sitcom Duet and its subsequent spin-off Open House. She also appeared in the 1994 film The Favor starring Brad Pitt. Her older sister Leigh Ann Orsi also co-starred in that film. Orsi has not acted professionally since then and has since pursued a career in music. In 2009, she released a four-track EP entitled Take a Bath with Me.

Filmography

References

External links
 

1984 births
Living people
20th-century American actresses
Actresses from Los Angeles
American child actresses
American film actresses
American television actresses
21st-century American singers
21st-century American women singers